The following is a list of 2022 box office number-one films in Japan by week. When the number-one film in gross is not the same as the number-one film in admissions, both are listed.

Highest-grossing films

The following is a list of the top 10 highest-grossing films in Japan.

See also
List of Japanese films of 2022

References

2022
Japan
2022 in Japanese cinema